The following outline is provided as an overview of and topical guide to firefighting:

Firefighting – act of extinguishing fires. A firefighter fights these fires to prevent destruction of life, property and the environment. Firefighting is a highly technical skill that requires professionals who have spent years training in both general firefighting techniques and specialized areas of expertise.

Essence of firefighting

 Fire
 Fire department
 Firefighter

Types of uncontrolled fires

 fire on board
 Firestorm
 Structure fire
 Wildfire
 Forest fire
 Brush fire

Firefighting organizations

Agencies
 Fire authority
 Fire department
 Fire service in the United Kingdom
 National Fire Information Council
 National Fire Protection Association

Fire departments
 Cleveland Division of Fire
 Fire Services Department, Hong Kong
 London Fire Brigade
 International Association of Wildland Fire
 Singapore Civil Defence Force

Unions and professional associations
 Chief Fire Officers Association
 Fire Brigades Union
 Institution of Fire Engineers
 International Association of Fire Fighters
 New Zealand Professional Firefighters Union
 United Firefighters Union of Australia
 UK firefighter dispute 2002-2003
 Southern African Emergency Services Institute - South Africa

Museums
 London Fire Brigade Museum

Training establishments
 Fire Service College

History of firefighting

History of fire brigades
History of fire brigades in the United Kingdom
 List of historic fires

General firefighting concepts

 Airport Crash Tender
 Advanced life support
 Arson
 Backdraft
 Basic life support
 Burn
 Bunker gear
 Combustion
 Dead Man Zone
 Deluge gun
 Dispatcher
 Draft
 Dry riser
 Dry Standpipe
 Emergency medical services
 Emergency medical technician
 Emergency service
 Enhanced 911
 Evacuation
 Fire apparatus
 Fireboat
 Fire chief's vehicle
 Fire code
 Fire classes
 Fire control
 Fire department
 Fire engine
 Firefighter
 Firefighter Assist and Search Team
 Firefighting worldwide
 Fire hazard
 Fire siren
 Fireman's switch
 Fire hydrant
 Fire inspector
 Fire lookout tower
 Fireman's carry
 Fire Marshal
 Fire Master
 Fire point
 Fire police
 Fire protection
 Fire-retardant material
 Fire safety
 Fire Service College
 Fire station
 Fire tetrahedron
 Fire triangle
 Fire truck
 Firefighter's Combat Challenge
 Firewall
 First aid
 First Responder
 Flash fire
 Flash point
 Flashover
 Forcible entry
 Gaseous fire suppression
 Heat detector
 Immolation
 International Association of Fire Fighters
 International Firefighters' Day
 London Fire Brigade Museum
 Master stream
 National Fire Incident Reporting System
 Nomex
 Paramedic
 Self contained breathing apparatus
 Short circuit
 Siren
 Smoke detector
 Smoke inhalation
 Smokejumper
 Splash suit
 Station Officer
 Stop, drop and roll
 Structure fire
 Super Scooper
 Two-in, two-out
 Uncontrolled fire
 Ventilation
 Volunteer fire department
 Water tender
 Wetdown
 Wildfire
 World Police and Fire Games

Policy and legislation
Chief Fire and Rescue Adviser
Fire authority
Fire Brigades Act 1938
Fire Services Act 1947
Fire and Rescue Services Act 2004
Fire service in the United Kingdom
Her Majesty's Fire Service Inspectorate for Scotland
History of fire safety legislation in the United Kingdom
Independent Review of the Fire Service
Regulatory Reform (Fire Safety) Order 2005

Operational command and procedures
Gold Silver Bronze command structure
FiReControl
FireLink
New Dimension programme

Firefighting lists

Glossary of firefighting terms
 List of UK public fire and rescue services
 Glossary of firefighting equipment
 Glossary of wildland fire terms
 List of historic fires
 List of firefighting films

See also

Women in firefighting

External links

 CDC - NIOSH Fire Fighter Fatality Investigation and Prevention Program

 
Firefighting
Firefighting